Jesús Andrés Rivas Gutiérrez (born 29 October 2002) is a Mexican professional footballer who plays as a right-back for Liga MX club UNAM.

International career
In 2022, Rivas was selected by coach Raúl Chabrand to participate in that year's Toulon Tournament with the under-21 squad, where Mexico finished the tournament in third place.

Career statistics

Club

References

2002 births
Living people
Mexican footballers
Mexico youth international footballers
Association football defenders
Club Universidad Nacional footballers
Liga MX players
Footballers from Mexico City